Gottröra Church is a church in the village of Gottröra in Norrtälje Municipality, Sweden. The church was originally raised in the 12th century, and has been rebuilt several times.

References

12th-century churches in Sweden
Buildings and structures in Stockholm County
Churches in the Diocese of Uppsala
Churches converted from the Roman Catholic Church to the Church of Sweden